HMS Decoy was an  composite gunboat of the Royal Navy, built at Pembroke Dockyard and launched on 12 October 1871. She served in both the Third Anglo-Ashanti War in 1873 and the Bombardment of Alexandria in 1882. She rapidly became obsolete and was sold in 1885.

Design and construction
Designed by Sir Edward Reed, Chief Constructor of the Royal Navy, the Ariel-class gunboats were the first gunboats of composite construction. She was armed with two  64-pounder (56 cwt) muzzle-loading rifles and two  20-pounder Armstrong breech loaders.  All four guns were mounted on traversing carriages. All the ships of the class carried a three-masted barquentine rig.

Operational service

Decoy was deployed off the coast of West Africa to support the operations on the Gold Coast. She also took part in the bombardment of Bootry.

In 1882 she formed part of the Naval and Military forces at the Bombardment of Alexandria. Argus, Isis, and  blockaded Damietta.

Fate
She was sold at Malta in 1885.

References

Publications

 

1871 ships
Ships built in Pembroke Dock
Ariel-class gunboats
Victorian-era gunboats of the United Kingdom